Two ships of the Royal Navy have borne the name HMS Eridge:

  was a  paddle minesweeper launched in 1916 and sold in 1922.
  was a  launched in 1940. She was disabled in 1942 by an Italian motor torpedo boat off Egypt and used as a base ship, before being scrapped in 1946.

Royal Navy ship names